Medefaidrin (Medefidrin), or , is a constructed language and script created as a Christian sacred language by an Ibibio congregation in 1930s Nigeria. It has its roots in glossolalia ('speaking in tongues').

History 
Speakers consider Medefaidrin to be a 'spirit language'. It was created by two leaders of the church, Michael Ukpong and Akpan Akpan Udofia. They state that the Holy Spirit revealed the words of the language to Ukpong, while Udofia wrote them down. At the time Ibibio was not a written language, and Udofia created a script to write Medefaidrin.

After finalizing the language in 1936, members of the church started a school in which children were instructed in Medefaidrin. This was not tolerated by the British colonial government, who closed the school that same year. Nonetheless, the language continued to be used for church activities, including liturgy and hymns, and for letters and written contracts between members. The language faded from use, but in 1986 Udofia began teaching it again in the church's Sunday school in Ididep. Old manuscripts in the script are in poor condition, and in the 21st century there has been some effort to preserve them.

Linguistic properties 
Medefaidrin is a stress-accented rather than tonal language, though this may be changing under Ibibio influence. Unlike the Ibibio language, there are several consonant clusters in Medefaidrin, many of which do not exist in English.

Grammar 
Structurally, the language is largely a relexification of English, although the semantics are closer to the native language of its users, Ibibio. The definite article is dei, and several prepositions alliterate or rhyme with their English equivalents:  "to",  "from",  "by",  "in". Most words, however, resemble nothing in English or Ibibio, but appear to have been created without a specific underlying system. The morphology is not highly developed, but a few elements have been taken from English, such as the plural in -s (z?).

Numbers and dates 
The vigesimal numbering system and calendar reflect Ibibio norms. The calendar year contains sixteen four-week months.

Writing system 

The script has upper- and lower-case letters like the English alphabet, but the letters were invented and there is no systematic relationship between glyph and sound. There are a number of arbitrary digraphs, whose pronunciation cannot be determined from their component letters, again as in English.

Unicode 

Medefaidrin script was added to the Unicode Standard in June, 2018 with the release of version 11.0.

The Unicode block for Medefaidrin is U+16E40–U+16E9F and contains 91 characters:

See also
 Eskayan language and script of the Philippines
 Lingua Ignota and script of Germany

Notes

References

Bibliography 

 
 
 
 
 
 
 

Constructed languages
Constructed languages introduced in the 1930s
Christian liturgical languages
Constructed scripts
Languages of Nigeria
Language and mysticism
Sacred languages